Stonogobiops dracula, the Dracula shrimpgoby, is a species of goby native to reef environments around the Seychelles and the Maldives.  It can be found at depths of  where it inhabits areas of rubble or sand near to the reefs where it is a commensal with the shrimp Alpheus randalli.  This species can reach a length of  TL.

References

dracula
Taxa named by Roger Lubbock
Taxa named by Nicholas Vladimir Campbel Polunin
Fish described in 1977